The Loire Campaign was a campaign launched by Joan of Arc during the Hundred Years' War. The Loire was cleared of all English and Burgundian troops.

Campaign

The English under John, Duke of Bedford ordered John, Lord Talbot to besiege Orléans with his subordinates, the Earl of Suffolk and the Earl of Salisbury. The English nearly succeeded. However, Joan of Arc led a series of counterattacks. Joan, aided by Gilles de Rais, Jean de Dunois, and Jean de Brosse attacked the English siege positions. The English could not stand these attacks. Lord Talbot had to retreat and break off the siege.

The Battle of Jargeau 

Then, Joan and John II, Duke of Alençon marched to capture Jargeau from the Earl of Suffolk. The English had 700 troops to face 1,200 French troops. Then, a battle began with a French assault on the suburbs. English defenders left the city walls and the French fell back. Joan of Arc used her standard to begin a French rally. The English retreated to the city walls and the French lodged in the suburbs for the night.

The following morning Joan of Arc called upon the defenders to surrender. They refused. The French followed with heavy artillery bombardment using primitive cannons and siege engines. One of the town's towers fell. Suffolk entered surrender nominations with a minor French captain, La Hire. This breach of protocol antagonized the French command.

Joan of Arc initiated an assault on the town walls, surviving a stone projectile that split in two against her helmet as she climbed a scaling ladder. The English suffered heavy losses. Most estimates place the number at 300–400 of some 700 combatants. Suffolk became a prisoner. The French had some 1200 troops and their losses appear to have been light. Joan moved her army to Meung-sur-Loire. There, she decided to launch an assault.

The Battle of Meung-sur-Loire 

Then, Joan began her attacks. English defenses at Meung-sur-Loire consisted of three components: the walled town, the fortification at the bridge, and a large walled castle just outside the town. The castle served as headquarters to the English command of John, Lord Talbot and Thomas, Lord Scales.

Joan of Arc and Duke John II of Alençon controlled a force that included captains Jean d'Orléans, Gilles de Rais, Jean Poton de Xaintrailles, and La Hire. Estimates of numerical strength vary with the Journal du Siège d'Orléans citing 6000 - 7000 for the French. A number that large probably counts noncombatants. The English force's numbers remain uncertain, but are lower than the French. They were led by Lord Talbot and Lord Scales. Bypassing the city and the castle, they staged a frontal assault on the bridge fortifications, conquered it in one day, and installed a garrison. This hampered English movement south of the Loire.

The Battle of Beaugency 

Then, Joan continued her campaign. She launched an attack on Beaugency. Joan of Arc and Duke John II of Alençon controlled a force that included captains Jean d'Orléans, Gilles de Rais, Jean Poton de Xaintrailles, and La Hire. John Talbot led the English defense. Breaking with siege warfare custom, the French army followed the 15 June capture of the bridge at Meung-sur-Loire not with an attack on that town or its castle but with an assault on neighboring Beaugency the next day.

Unlike Meung-sur-Loire, the main stronghold at Beaugency was inside the city walls. It survives to the modern age and forms an imposing rectangular citadel. During the first day of fighting the English abandoned the town and retreated into the castle. The French bombarded the castle with artillery fire. That evening de Richemont and his force arrived.

Hearing news of an English relief force approaching from Paris under Sir John Fastolf, d'Alençon negotiated the English surrender and granted them safe conduct out of Beaugency. The Battle of Patay followed on open territory on 18 June.

The Battle of Patay 

An English reinforcement army under Sir John Fastolf departed from Paris following the defeat at Orléans. The French had moved swiftly, capturing three bridges and accepting the English surrender at Beaugency the day before Fastolf's army arrived. The French, in the belief that they could not overcome a fully prepared English army in open battle, scoured the area in hopes of finding the English unprepared and vulnerable.

The English reconnoitered with remaining defenders at Meung-sur-Loire. The French had taken only the bridge at this location, not the neighboring castle or the town. Retreating defenders from Beaugency joined them. The English excelled at open battles; they took up a position whose exact location is unknown but traditionally believed to be near the tiny village of Patay. Fastolf, John Talbot and Sir Thomas de Scales commanded the English.

The standard defensive tactic of the English longbowmen was to drive pointed stakes into the ground near their positions. This prevented cavalry charges and slowed infantry long enough for the longbows to take a decisive toll on the enemy line. However, the English archers inadvertently disclosed their position to French scouts before their preparations were complete when a lone stag wandered onto a nearby field and the archers raised a hunting cry.

On hearing the news of the English position, about 1,500 men under captains La Hire and Jean Poton de Xaintrailles, composing the heavily armed and armoured cavalry vanguard of the French army, attacked the English. The battle swiftly turned into a rout, with every Englishman on a horse fleeing while the infantry, mostly composed of longbowmen, were cut down in droves. Longbowmen were never intended to fight armoured knights unsupported except from prepared positions where the knights could not charge them, and they were massacred. For once the French tactic of a large frontal cavalry assault had succeeded, with decisive results.

Captain Jean Dagneau captured the famous general John Talbot. After this feat of arms, Dagneau was ennobled in March 1438 by Charles VII, King of France, which is at the origin of the family name of Dagneau de Richecour.

Aftermath 
Joan had won a great victory over the English at all of the battles. The campaign drove the English out of the Loire river, and routed Fastolf back to Paris where he had departed from. The French pushed on to victory, pointing the finger at Joan of Arc.

1429 in England
1420s in France
Battles of the Hundred Years' War
Joan of Arc
Conflicts in 1428
Conflicts in 1429
Hundred Years' War, 1415–1453
Military campaigns involving France